May 27 - Eastern Orthodox Church calendar - May 29

All fixed commemorations below celebrated on June 10 by Orthodox Churches on the Old Calendar.

For May 28th, Orthodox Churches on the Old Calendar commemorate the Saints listed on May 15.

Saints
 Hieromartyr Eutychius of Melitene, Bishop of Melitene (1st century)
 Woman martyr Heliconis of Thessalonica (244)
 Saint Alexander, Bishop of Thessalonica (4th century)
 Hieromartyr Helladius of the East, bishop (4th century) (see also May 27)
 Venerable Nicetas the Confessor, Archbishop of Chalcedon (early 9th century)
 Blessed Andrew of Constantinople, Fool-for-Christ of Constantinople (911)
 Venerable Virgin-Martyr Philothea (Philothea of Pamphylia), Wonderworker

Pre-Schism Western saints
 Martyrs Crescens, Paul, Dioscorides and Helladius, of Rome (244)
 Martyrs Aemilius, Felix, Priamus, and Lucian, in Sardinia.
 Saint Senator of Milan, Bishop of Milan, (480)
 Hieromartyr Caraunus (Ceraunus, Cheron), Deacon, near Chartres (5th century)
 Saint Justus of Urgell, first recorded Bishop of Urgell, in Catalonia in Spain (527)<ref>Great Synaxaristes:  Ὁ Ἅγιος Ἰούστος Ἐπίσκοπος Οὐργέλλης. 28 Μαΐου. ΜΕΓΑΣ ΣΥΝΑΞΑΡΙΣΤΗΣ.</ref>
 Saint Germain of Paris (Germanus), Bishop (576)Great Synaxaristes:  Ὁ Ἅγιος Γερμανὸς Ἐπίσκοπος Παρισίων. 28 Μαΐου. ΜΕΓΑΣ ΣΥΝΑΞΑΡΙΣΤΗΣ. ЖУРНАЛЫ заседания Священного Синода от 9 марта 2017 года. Русская Православная Церковь - Официальный сайт Московского Патриархата (Patriarchia.ru). 9 марта 2017 г. 20:08. Retrieved: 14 March 2017.
 Saint William of Gellone, built a monastery at Gellone in France, later named Saint-Guilhem-le-Désert (812)
 Saint Podius, Bishop of Florence from 990, and Confessor (1002)

Post-Schism Orthodox saints
 Saint Ignatius of Rostov, Bishop and Wonderworker (1288)
 Saint Gerontius, Metropolitan of Moscow (1489)
 Venerable Sophronius of Bulgaria, Monk (1510)
 New Martyr Demetrius (Mitros) of Tripolitsa (1794)
 New Hieromartyr Zachariah, Priest of Prusa (1802)
 Saint Helen Manturova, Nun of Diveyevo (1832)June 10 / May 28. HOLY TRINITY RUSSIAN ORTHODOX CHURCH (A parish of the Patriarchate of Moscow).
 Blessed Domnica (Likvinenko), Ascetic of Cherson (1967)Dr. Alexander Roman. May. Calendar of Ukrainian Orthodox Saints (Ukrainian Orthodoxy - Українське Православ'я).

New martyrs and confessors
 Hieromartyrs Macarius Morzhov, and Nicholas Aristov (Deacon) (1931) 28 мая (ст.ст.) 10 июня  (нов. ст.). Русская Православная Церковь Отдел внешних церковных связей. (DECR).
 Martyrs Dionisius Petushkov, Ignatius Markov and Peter Yudin (1931)
 Hieromartyr Heraclius Motyah, Confessor (1936)
 Hieromartyr Basil Preobrazhensky, Priest (1940)
 Hieromartyr Hermogenes Kadomtsev (1942)

Other commemorations
 Icon of the Mother of God of Nicea (304)
 Icon of the Mother of God "the Unbreakable Wall".Great Synaxaristes:  Σύναξις Ὑπεραγίας Θεοτόκου τοῦ «νοητοῦ τείχους», ἐν Ρωσία. 28 Μαΐου. ΜΕΓΑΣ ΣΥΝΑΞΑΡΙΣΤΗΣ.
 Icon of the Mother of God the "Softener of Evil Hearts".Great Synaxaristes:  Σύναξις Ὑπεραγίας Θεοτόκου τῆς Κυρίας τῆς Εἰρήνης, ἐν Ρωσία. 28 Μαΐου. ΜΕΓΑΣ ΣΥΝΑΞΑΡΙΣΤΗΣ.
 Synaxis of the Galich "Umilenie-Tenderness" Icon of the Mother of God (1350)Great Synaxaristes:  Σύναξις Ὑπεραγίας Θεοτόκου ἐν Γκαλίτς τῆς Ρωσίας. 28 Μαΐου. ΜΕΓΑΣ ΣΥΝΑΞΑΡΙΣΤΗΣ.  (see also: July 20, August 15)

Icon gallery

Notes

References

Sources 
 May 28/June 10. Orthodox Calendar (PRAVOSLAVIE.RU).
 June 10 / May 28. HOLY TRINITY RUSSIAN ORTHODOX CHURCH (A parish of the Patriarchate of Moscow).
 Complete List of Saints. Protection of the Mother of God Church (POMOG).
 May 28. OCA - The Lives of the Saints.
 Dr. Alexander Roman. [http://www.ukrainian-orthodoxy.org/calendar/may/default.html May. Calendar of Ukrainian Orthodox Saints (Ukrainian Orthodoxy - Українське Православ'я).
 May 28. Latin Saints of the Orthodox Patriarchate of Rome.
 May 28. The Roman Martyrology.

 Greek Sources
 Great Synaxaristes:  28 ΜΑΪΟΥ. ΜΕΓΑΣ ΣΥΝΑΞΑΡΙΣΤΗΣ.
  Συναξαριστής. 28 Μαΐου. ECCLESIA.GR. (H ΕΚΚΛΗΣΙΑ ΤΗΣ ΕΛΛΑΔΟΣ).

 Russian Sources
  10 июня (28 мая). Православная Энциклопедия под редакцией Патриарха Московского и всея Руси Кирилла (электронная версия). (Orthodox Encyclopedia - Pravenc.ru).
  28 мая (ст.ст.) 10 июня  (нов. ст.). Русская Православная Церковь Отдел внешних церковных связей. (DECR).

May in the Eastern Orthodox calendar